General Vance may refer to:

Jack Vance (general) (1933–2013), Canadian Army lieutenant general
Jamil Rahmat Vance (fl. 2010s), Pakistan Army major general
Jonathan Vance (born 1964), Canadian Army general
Joseph Vance (Ohio politician) (1786–1852), Ohio State Militia major general
Robert B. Vance (1828–1899), Confederate States Army brigadier general